Joana Vaya Malinao Michaelson (born 12 February 1990), née Houplin, is a Filipino-American association football coach and former international footballer who played as a midfielder for Seattle Sounders Women. Houplin was also the top scorer at the 2013 AFF Women's Championship scoring 8 goals.

Early life and education
Joana Houplin was born in the Philippines on February 12, 1990. She has both Philippine and United States citizenship. Houplin later moved to England at age 4 and later to the United States at 12.

She attended the Olympia High School and also the Western Washington University where she obtained a bachelor's degree in kinesiology in 2012. She pursued graduate studies in sports science in the same university.

Competitive career

High school
Houplin played soccer for Olympia High School. On her senior year she was named part of the first-team Class 4A all-state selection. She was also named the Tacoma News Tribune all-Area and Narrows League MVP and The Olympian Area MVP for her stint with her high school.

Collegiate
Houplin played for the Western Washington Vikings, the soccer team of her college from 2008 to 2012. As a senior in 2012 she was named part of the second-team National Soccer Coaches Association of America West Region all-star selection. She led team in a Far West Regional final and won both the Great Northwest Athletic Conference regular-season and tournament titles. In her four year stint with her college's team, she scored 12 goals and made 11 assists for 35 points.

Club
She played as part of the reserves team of Seattle Reign FC from 2013 to 2015. Simultaneously, she played for the Issaquah Gunners of the Women's Premier Soccer League from 2012 to 2015. In 2014, she was part of the Seattle Sounders Women.

International
In late-March 2013, she took part in a week long training camp by the Philippines national football team in Corona, California which led to her selection as part of the squad that will later participate at the 2014 AFC Women's Asian Cup qualifiers. She last played for the Philippines in 2015.

International goals
Scores and results list the Philippines' goal tally first.

Coaching career
Since 2014, she is the head coach of Northwest United FC. She is a holder of at least a USSF National "D" License. Houplin is also involved with the women's soccer team of the Western Washington University, her alma mater, as a volunteer assistant coach

References

1990 births
Living people
American sportspeople of Filipino descent
Citizens of the Philippines through descent
Western Washington University alumni
Filipino women's footballers
American women's soccer players
Philippines women's international footballers
Women's association football forwards
21st-century American women